Yanawaqra (Quechua yana black, waqra horn, "black horn", Hispanicized spelling Yanahuaccra) is a mountain in the Andes of Peru, about  high. It is situated in the Ayacucho Region, Huanca Sancos Province, on the border of the districts Lucanamarca and Sancos.

See also 
 Kunturillu
 Yanakusma

References

Mountains of Peru
Mountains of Ayacucho Region